One Way Ticket is a 1988 Dominican drama film directed by Agliberto Meléndez. The film was selected as the Dominican entry for the Best Foreign Language Film at the 61st Academy Awards, but was not accepted as a nominee.

Cast
 Carlos Alfredo as Isidro
 Ángel Haché as Piro
 Rafael Villalona as Quimo
 Ángel Muñiz as René
 Víctor Checo as Ángel
 Félix Germán as Berlarminio
 Frank Lendor as Comandante
 Giovanny Cruz as Rufino
 Johanny Sosa as Eladio

See also
 List of submissions to the 61st Academy Awards for Best Foreign Language Film
 List of Dominican submissions for the Academy Award for Best Foreign Language Film

References

External links
 

1988 films
1988 drama films
Dominican Republic drama films
1980s Spanish-language films
1988 directorial debut films